Eight women's teams competed in basketball at the 1992 Summer Olympics.

Group A

Brazil

Cuba

Italy

Unified Team

Group B

China

Czechoslovakia

Spain

United States

References

1992
1992 in women's basketball